Maksim Sergeyevich Grigoryev (born 6 July 1990) is a Russian professional footballer. He plays for FC Metallurg Lipetsk.

Club career

Spartak
Grigoryev made his debut in the Russian Premier League on 21 March 2009 in a game against FC Kuban Krasnodar. He played two games in the 2008–09 UEFA Cup for FC Spartak Moscow against NK Dinamo Zagreb and Tottenham Hotspur F.C.

Rostov
In early 2011, his contract with FC Spartak Moscow expired, and he decided to switch to FC Rostov. According to Russian football regulations, when a player under 23 years of age who was raised in the club system transfers to a different club after his contract expires, his old club is due compensation from his new club. If the new club plays on the third level (Russian Second Division), the compensation is the player's previous 5 years' salary multiplied by 1, if his new club is in the Russian First Division, it's multiplied by 2 and if it's a Russian Premier League club, it's multiplied by 3. Grigoryev and two other Spartak alumni, Dmitri Malyaka and Yevgeni Filippov, signed with a Russian Second Division team FC MITOS Novocherkassk who immediately loaned them to the Russian Premier League team FC Rostov. Spartak lodged a complaint with the Russian Football Union, claiming this was not a fair transfer as the only reason for it was to lower the compensation that FC Rostov was due to pay Spartak. After the protest was declined on 29 March 2011, Grigoryev was registered for FC Rostov and scored a goal on his debut against FC Lokomotiv Moscow on 2 April 2011. FC Lokomotiv's president, Olga Smorodskaya, filed a complaint with the Russian Football Union and Premier League, claiming Grigoryev was not eligible to be registered and play for FC Rostov. Lokomotiv's protest was eventually denied.

Lokomotiv
In January 2012, Grigoryev signed three-and-a-half-year deal with FC Lokomotiv Moscow.

Rostov (third spell)
Grigoryev left Rostov by mutual consent on 17 July 2017.

Career statistics

Notes

International career
Grigoryev made his debut for Russia under-21 football team against Poland under-21 team on 6 September 2011.

He was called up by Fabio Capello to the national team for the 2014 FIFA World Cup qualifiers against Portugal and against Azerbaijan in October 2012.

He made his debut for the main squad in a friendly against the United States on 14 November 2012.

References

External links
 
  Profile on the FC Spartak Moscow site

1990 births
Sportspeople from Lipetsk
Living people
Russian footballers
Association football wingers
Russia international footballers
Russia under-21 international footballers
FC Spartak Moscow players
FC Rostov players
FC Lokomotiv Moscow players
FC Orenburg players
FC Ural Yekaterinburg players
FC Baltika Kaliningrad players
FC Avangard Kursk players
FC Fakel Voronezh players
FC SKA Rostov-on-Don players
FC Metallurg Lipetsk players
Russian Premier League players
Russian First League players
Russian Second League players